Apatemyia is a genus of bristle flies in the family Tachinidae. There are at least three described species in Apatemyia.

Species
These three species belong to the genus Apatemyia:
 Apatemyia bicolor (Bigot, 1885) c
 Apatemyia flavipes (Macquart, 1851) c g
 Apatemyia longipes Macquart, 1846 c g
Data sources: i = ITIS, c = Catalogue of Life, g = GBIF, b = Bugguide.net

References

Further reading

External links

 
 

Tachinidae